Omoglymmius malabaricus is a species of beetle in the subfamily Rhysodidae. It was described by Arrow in 1901.

References

malabaricus
Beetles described in 1901